A Juliet cap is a small open-work crocheted or mesh cap, often decorated with pearls, beads, or jewels, and chiefly worn with evening gowns or as bridal wear.  The cap is named after the heroine of Shakespeare's Romeo and Juliet, who is sometimes portrayed wearing one.

An article in Every Woman's Encyclopaedia (London, 1910) suggested:

See also
Half hat
Dutch cap
Gandhi cap
Cap of Maintenance
Baseball cap

References

Caps
Romeo and Juliet
Fictional costumes